Kazutaka Kogi (born 1933) is a Japanese academic known for his contributions to simple, low-cost interventions in small manufacturing enterprises that improve the working conditions for the employees and at the same time also improve the overall productivity of the workforce.  The interventions are based on simple and low-cost modifications, on local solutions to highly specific local problems and specifically on the collaboration between the shopfloor and the managerial level.  This collaborative or participatory approach is possible because the intervention is presented as a win-win situation for both parties.  Kazutaka Kogi and his colleague Kageyo Noro are considered to have founded the concept of participatory ergonomics in Singapore in 1983

He has worked extensively for the International Labour Organization and held the Vice-Presidency for ICOH in 2006-2009.

Notes

See also
 Participatory ergonomics
 Work improvement in small enterprises

References

External links
 The website of Dr. Kazutaka Kogi -  (includes a CV)

Occupational safety and health
1933 births
Living people